André Patey (16 January 1942 – 16 February 2020) was a French bobsledder. He competed in the four-man event at the 1968 Winter Olympics.

References

External links
 

1942 births
2020 deaths
French male bobsledders
Olympic bobsledders of France
Bobsledders at the 1968 Winter Olympics
Place of birth missing